Polenta may refer to:

Polenta, an Italian dish made from boiled cornmeal
Polenta (moth), a synonym of the moth genus Plagiomimicus in the family Noctuidae
A locality near Bertinoro in Romagna, Italy
The da Polenta family, also known as the Polenta and as the Polentani, from the same area
Diego Polenta (born 1992), Uruguayan footballer